Covenant Life may refer to:

 Covenant Life, Alaska, United States
 Covenant Life Church, a 2800+ member "reformed charismatic" church in Gaithersburg, Maryland